This is a list of all Magic: The Gathering Pro Tour events. Pro Tours are professional, invite-only tournaments featuring large cash prizes. The World Championships were considered a Pro Tour from 1996 to 2011, but were discontinued in 2012. When the World Championship was reintroduced in 2013 it was changed to a smaller scale non-Pro Tour event. From 2019, Pro Tours were rebranded Mythic Championships, three of which per year are held with physical cards, three in Magic: The Gathering Arena. From 2020, they were again rebranded as Players Tour events, with twelve events to be held each year: three series per year, each consisting of three regional events (Americas, Europe, and Asia–Pacific) which serve as qualifiers for a single finals event for that series. MTG Arena will also offer Pro Tour-like events still called Mythic Invitationals, with a US$750,000 prize pool.

However, due to the COVID-19 pandemic, all in-person events scheduled to occur after 9 February 2020 were cancelled until further notice; a different set of MTG Arena tournaments were scheduled in their place. In particular, the 2020 season was reworked by cancelling the April finals event for Players Tour Series 1, and replacing the three regional events of Players Tour Series 2 with four online events dubbed Players Tour Online, followed by a single online event in August that served as the finals for both Series 1 and Series 2. The Mythic Invitationals planned for May and July (to coincide with the releases of Ikoria: Lair of Behemoths and Core 2021, respectively) were also replaced by a single Mythic Invitational in September. Both the Series 1/2 Final and the 2020 Mythic Invitational served as qualifiers for a 32-player event to culminate the 2020 season, called the 2020 Season Grand Finals.

The ongoing 2020–21 season will focus on three split seasons, each centered around a set release. Each split is slated to comprise three Qualifier Weekends on MTG Arena which serve as one method of qualifying for that split's finals event, called a Championship. All events are currently scheduled for online play via MTG Arena, though Wizards of the Coast has stated that they intend to add in-person qualifiers and adjust the seasons' formats if and when it becomes safe to do so.

The first Pro Tour was held in New York City in 1996. Invitations are usually earned by winning a qualifier tournament. Other means of qualifying include, finishing high in a Grand Prix or in the previous Pro Tour, and being part of the Magic Pro- and Rivals Leagues.



List of Pro Tours

Key

Pro Tours by country

Short summary of Pro Tour wins by country:

By default, the detailed table below is sorted in descending order, first by number of PTs won, then by number of winning players, then by number of PTs hosted, and finally by alphabetical order of the country.

The totals for each of the three columns will be different from each other, for several reasons:

 Team Pro Tours feature multiple winners, possibly from different countries.
 The same individual may win multiple Pro Tours.
 Future Pro Tours will already have been scheduled at a host city but not yet have a winner.

Notes

References